David Croft (born 22 February 1979 in Brisbane) is a former Australian rugby union player.
He played openside flanker (Number 7) for the Queensland Reds, Melbourne Rebels (ARC) and Brothers.

He also won 5 caps representing Australia and was included in the squad that took part in the 2003 Rugby World Cup.

He retired from professional rugby in 2008 aged 29, and definitely in late 2009, aged 30.

He then became the General Manager of International Quarterback the Sports Management Company who manage Australia Sporting stars such as Grant Hackett, Libby Trickett and Michael Clarke.

External links
Queensland Reds Profile
International statistics from Scrum.com

1979 births
Australia international rugby union players
Australian rugby union players
Barbarian F.C. players
Brothers Old Boys players
Living people
Queensland Reds players
Rugby union flankers
Rugby union players from Brisbane